Norman Findlay Buchan (27 October 1922 – 23 October 1990) was a Labour Party politician, who was on the left-wing of the party, and represented the West Renfrewshire seat from 1964 until 1983 and the Paisley South seat from 1983 until his death in 1990.

Early life
A schoolteacher based in Rutherglen, he was interested in folk music, compiling a book entitled 101 Scottish Songs,<ref>Buchan, Norman. 101 Scottish Songs (Glasgow; London: Collins, 1962).</ref> often referred to as The Wee Red Book''.

Political career
At the 1964 Rutherglen by-election, he only lost the Labour selection meeting fairly narrowly to Gregor Mackenzie, and he went on to take West Renfrewshire from the Conservatives at the general election later that year. Whilst a Member of Parliament, he served as Joint Under Secretary of State for Scotland from 1966 to 1970, and as Minister of State for Agriculture from 1974 to 1979. He later became Shadow Minister for the Arts in opposition.

Buchan opposed an early day motion to block the televised version of Tony Harrison's poem "V" on Channel 4, saying that members who opposed the broadcast had either not read or understood the poem.

Buchan was also influential in changing the voting system for the referendum on Scottish Home Rule in the late 1970s.

During Labour's 1981 deputy leadership election, he supported John Silkin, who stood representing the political centre of the party, on the first ballot and abstained on the second ballot after Silkin was eliminated and the contest came to Tony Benn on the left and Denis Healey on the right. Buchan said: "My brain turned against Benn, but my stomach turned against Healey."

He died in 1990 (coincidentally, the MP for neighbouring Paisley North, Allen Adams, also died that year, resulting in by-elections being held in the same month for the two seats). He was succeeded as MP for Paisley South by Gordon McMaster, also of the Labour Party.

Family
He was married for 44 years (1946–1990) to Janey Buchan (née Kent), Labour Member of the European Parliament for Glasgow from 1979 to 1994. She died in Brighton on 14 January 2012. His only son, Alasdair Buchan, has been a journalist since 1968.

References

External links 
 
The Norman & Janey Buchan Collection at Glasgow Caledonian University

1922 births
1990 deaths
Rutherglen
Scottish schoolteachers
20th-century Scottish writers
Scottish folk-song collectors
Members of the Parliament of the United Kingdom for Paisley constituencies
Scottish Labour MPs
UK MPs 1964–1966
UK MPs 1966–1970
UK MPs 1970–1974
UK MPs 1974
UK MPs 1974–1979
UK MPs 1979–1983
UK MPs 1983–1987
UK MPs 1987–1992
20th-century British musicologists
Ministers in the Wilson governments, 1964–1970